Appoorva Muralinath (born in Chennai, Tamil Nadu) is an Indian basketball player and coach. She was an active athlete from 2005-2017. She played on the India women's national basketball team from 2010-2015. She is a power forward/Center. She is the daughter of K. Muralinath who played for the Indian National Men's Basketball Team in the 1982 Asian Games.

Muralinath is currently the assistant women's basketball coach at Williams College.

Education

Personal details
Muralinath's father K. Muralinath played for the Indian National Basketball Team.

Professional-playing experience
2015: Professional Basketball Athlete Representing Country India

•Represented the Indian Senior Women Basketball team at the 26th FIBA Asian Championship for Women held at Wuhan, China.

•16 International teams participated.

2012: Professional Basketball Athlete Representing Country India

•Represented the Indian Senior Women Basketball Team at the William Jones Cup for Women held at Taipei, Taiwan.

•10 International teams participated.

2011: National Games of India

•Represented her state team (Tamil Nadu) in National Games Championship organized by Indian Olympic Association (IOA) at Ranchi, India

•More than 30 state teams participated.

•Secured Gold medal in the championship.

2006 – 2015: Played for National Championships

•Played 10 Senior National Championships organized by the Basketball Federation of India (BFI).

•All (30) state teams participated.

•Has been awarded with 2 Gold, 3 Silver and 2 Bronze medals.

•Has represented her state (Tamil Nadu) team as well the (Indian Railways)

2012 – 2016:  Professional All India Inter-Railway Championships

•Played 5 Inter-Railway Championships organized by Indian Railways.

•4 state zones/16 teams participated.

•Has been awarded with 4 Gold, 1 Silver medals.

•Has captained the team (Southern Railway), and have received various awards.

2008-2012: All India Inter-University National Championships

•Played 5 Inter-University National Championships.

•More than 50 university teams participated.

•Has been awarded 2 gold and 3 silver medals.

•Has represented two different teams in 5 years.

•Has captained SRM University and Madras University team, and have received various awards including the most valuable player (MVP) award and the best re-bounder award.

2006 – 2008: Junior, Youth and School National Championships

•Represented and captained her state as well as the school teams in various national championships.in the championships.

•Has captained the teams in the championships, and received various awards including the most valuable player (MVP) award and the best re-bounder award.

Professional-coaching experience
 2019-2020, Assistant coach for women’s basketball team – Dean College, Franklin - MA

References

General references
 

Indian women's basketball players
1989 births
Living people
Basketball players from Tamil Nadu
Sportspeople from Chennai
Centers (basketball)
Power forwards (basketball)